Ambegaonkar is a surname. Notable people with the surname include:

K. G. Ambegaonkar, Indian banker
Mona Ambegaonkar (born 1970), Indian actress

Indian surnames